Sarah Mahfoud (born 29 September 1989) is a Faroese-born Danish professional boxer who won the IBF female featherweight title in July 2020. She subsequently lost to Amanda Serrano in a title unification bout in Manchester on 24 September 2022. As of September 2020, she is ranked as the world's second best active female featherweight by BoxRec and third by The Ring.

Professional career
Mahfoud made her professional debut on 11 February 2017, scoring a first-round technical knockout (TKO) victory over Petra Podraska at the Frederiksberghallen in Copenhagen, Denmark. She had three more fights that year, securing unanimous decision (UD) wins over Ainara Mota in April; Jessica Sanchez in June; and Gabriella Mezei in October.

She scored two fourth-round TKO victories in 2018 against Nana Chakhvashvili in January and Vanesa Caballero in September, followed by a UD win over Stephanie Ducastel in November.

She won her first professional title on 18 January 2019 at the Nykøbing Falster Hallen in Nykøbing, Denmark, by defeating Bukiwe Nonina for the vacant IBF Inter-Continental female featherweight title. All three judges scored the bout 100–90, 100–91 and 98–92 in favour of Mafhoud. She had one more fight that year; a UD win over Enerolisa de Leon in October.

Her first fight of 2020 was for the IBF interim female feather title against defending champion Brenda Carabajal. The bout took place at the Frederiksberghallen in Copenhagen, with Mahfoud winning via UD with scores of 100–90, 98–92 and 97–93.

Professional boxing record

See also
List of IBF female world champions

References

External links

Living people
People from Tórshavn
1989 births
Danish women boxers
Featherweight boxers